Belmore may refer to:

People 
 Bertha Belmore (1882–1953), British stage and film actress
 Lionel Belmore (1867–1953), English actor and film director
 Rebecca Belmore (born 1960), inter-disciplinary Anishinaabekwe artist

Places 
 Belmore Falls, a waterfall in southern New South Wales, Australia
 Belmore, New South Wales, a suburb of Sydney, New South Wales, Australia
 Belmore Sports Ground, a football field in Belmore, Sydney, New South Wales, Australia
 Belmore, Ohio, a town in Ohio, United States
 Belmore, Washington, an unincorporated community
 Belmore, Ontario, an area of Huron County, Ontario, Canada
 Belmore Park, a park in central Sydney, New South Wales, Australia

Other uses 
 Belmore Mountain, a hill in County Fermanagh, Northern Ireland, United Kingdom
 Earl Belmore, a title in the Irish peerage

See also
 Bellmore (disambiguation)